Lindera akoensis, the Taiwan spicebush, is a species of flowering plant in the family Lauraceae, endemic to Taiwan, where it is found in thickets. A perennial shrub with fragrant foliage and showy flowers and fruit, it reaches  at maturity. It is hardy in USDA zones 8 and 9, and is recommended for hedges, borders, and cottage gardens in partial shade.

References

akoensis
Endemic flora of Taiwan
Plants described in 1911